The boxing competition at the 1964 Summer Olympics was held from 11 to 23 October. The competition was for men only and there were ten weight classes.

Medal summary

Medal table

References

External links

Official Olympic Report
 1964 United States Olympic Book

 
1964 Summer Olympics events
1964
1964 in boxing